Looney is a surname. Notable people with the surname include: 

Andy Looney (born 1963), American game designer
Bernard Looney (born 1969/1970), Irish business executive
J. Thomas Looney (1870–1944), originator of the Oxfordian theory regarding the authorship of Shakespeare's plays
James Looney (born 1995), American football player
Jim Looney (born 1957), American football player
Joe Looney (offensive lineman) (born 1990), American football player
Joe Don Looney (1942–1988), American football player
John Looney (Cherokee chief) (c. 1782–1846), chief of the Cherokee nation
John Patrick Looney (1865–1947), American gangster in the Rock Island, Illinois, area during the early 1900s
Kevon Looney (born 1996), American basketball player
Lamar Looney (1871-1935), American politician
William R. Looney III (born 1949), American former Commander, Air Education and Training Command, United States Air Force

See also
Loney (name)
Michael O'Looney (born 1965), American business official, former government official, former journalist